The Max-Planck-Institut für Eisenforschung GmbH (MPIE) is a research institute of the Max Planck Society located in Düsseldorf.
Since 1971 it is legally independent and organized in the form of a GmbH, owned and financed equally by the Max Planck Society and the Steel Institute VDEh.
It conducts basic research on advanced materials, specifically steels and related metallic alloys.

History 
The institute was founded as Kaiser Wilhelm Institute for Iron Research in Aachen 1917, with Fritz Wüst being the founding director.
It moved 1921 to Düsseldorf and relocated from the "Rheinischen Metallwarenfabrik" to its current location in 1935.
In 1943, it move temporarily to Claustahl and in 1946 back to Düsseldorf.
Institutional co-sponsoring by industry (by Steel Institute VDEh) determines a unique example of a public private partnership both for the Max-Planck Society and for the European industry and should guarantee a close match between knowledge-oriented and pre-competitive basic research on the one hand and commercial relevance on the other hand.

Fields of research 
The Institute plays a central role in enabling progress in the fields of mobility (e.g. steels and soft magnets for light-weight hybrid vehicles and Ni-base alloys for plane turbines), energy (e.g. efficiency of thermal power conversion through better high temperature alloys and nanostructured solar cells), infrastructure (e.g. steels for large infrastructures, e.g. wind turbines and chemical plants), and safety (e.g. nanostructured bainitic steels for gas pipelines).
The Institute with its international team of about 300 employees is organized in four departments:

 Computational Materials Design (Prof. J. Neugebauer)
 Interface Chemistry and Surface Engineering (Prof. J. Neugebauer, temporarily while Prof. M. Stratmann is on leave)
 Microstructure Physics and Alloy Design (Prof. Dierk Raabe)
 Structure and Nano-/Micromechanics of Materials (Prof. G. Dehm)

In addition to departmental research, certain research activities are of common interest within the MPIE.
These central research areas are highly interdisciplinary and combine the experimental and theoretical expertise available in the different departments.

The six main cross-disciplinary topics are:
 Sustainability and decarburization
 Artificial intelligence and digitalisation
 Materials under harsh conditions
 Innovative materials
 Microstructure and properties
 Advanced methods

In many of these areas the Institute holds a position of international scientific leadership, particularly in multiscale materials modeling, surface science, metallurgical alloy design, and advanced structure characterization from atomic to macroscopic scales of complex engineering and functional materials.

Literature 
 Adolf von Harnack: Rede zur Weihe des Kaiser-Wilhelm-Instituts für Eisenforschung. 1921, In: Adolf von Harnack . Wissenschaftspolitische Reden und Aufsätze. zusammengestellt und herausgegeben von Bernhard Fabian, Olms-Weidmann, Hildeheim-Zürich-New York 2001,  (German).
 Max-Planck-Gesellschaft (Hrsg.): Max-Planck-Institut für Eisenforschung, Reihe: Berichte und Mitteilungen der Max-Planck-Gesellschaft 1993/5, ISSN 0341-7778 (German).

External links 
 Official institute home page
 Homepage of the International Max Planck Research School (IMPRS) for Surface and Interface Engineering in Advanced Materials
 DAMASK — the Düsseldorf Advanced Material Simulation Kit developed at MPIE

Iron Research
Materials science organizations